Sullivan House may refer to:

Sullivan Roadhouse, Delta Junction, AK, listed on the NRHP in Alaska
G. H. Sullivan Lodging House, Kingman, AZ, listed on the NRHP in Arizona
Sullivan–Hillyer House, Rome, GA, listed on the NRHP in Georgia
Sullivan-Kinney House, Pocatello, ID, listed on the NRHP in Idaho
Joseph P. O. Sullivan House, Maywood, IL, listed on the NRHP in Illinois
Bond–Sullivan House, Wichita, KS, listed on the NRHP in Kansas
 Sullivan House (Bogalusa, Louisiana), listed on the NRHP in Louisiana
Edward Sullivan House, Winchester, MA, listed on the NRHP in Massachusetts
Daniel O'Sullivan House/Halfway House, Flushing, MI, listed on the NRHP in Michigan
Johnson–Sullivant House, Kosciusko, MS, listed on the NRHP in Mississippi
James J. Sullivan House, Hardin, MT, listed on the NRHP in Montana
Sullivan Rooming House, Hardin, MT, listed on the NRHP in Montana
John Sullivan House, Durham, New Hampshire
Roger Sullivan House, Manchester, NH, listed on the NRHP in New Hampshire
Cornelius Sullivan House, Hillsboro, NM, listed on the NRHP in New Mexico
 Sullivan House (Laurens, South Carolina), listed on the NRHP in South Carolina
Robert Hodge House, Franklin, Tennessee, also known as Sullivan Farm House, NRHP-listed
James R. and Mary E. Sullivan House, Park City, UT, listed on the NRHP in Utah